Tri-Cities High School is a public high school in East Point, Georgia, United States. It is a part of the Fulton County School System. The school opened in 1988 under the leadership of principal Dr. Herschel Robinson.  It was originally formed by combining four schools: Woodland High School, Russell High School, College Park High School, and Hapeville High School.  Tri-Cities serves sections of East Point and College Park, and all of Hapeville. The current principal is Ethel Lett.

Notable alumni

 Andre 3000 (class of 1993) - musician, Outkast
 Big Boi (class of 1993) - musician, Outkast
 Jamison Brewer (class of 1998) - basketball player, NBA's Indiana Pacers, New York Knicks
 Kandi Burruss (class of 1994) - musician, Xscape, cast member of The Real Housewives of Atlanta 
 Edawn Coughman (class of 2006) - football player
 Tristan Davis (class of 2004) - football player, NFL's Miami Dolphins, New Orleans Saints, Pittsburgh Steelers, Minnesota Vikings, and Washington Redskins
 Kalimba Edwards (class of 1997) - football player, NFL's Detroit Lions
 Gorilla Zoe (class of 2001) - musician, Boyz n da Hood
 Jonas Jennings (class of 1996) - football player, NFL's Buffalo Bills, San Francisco 49ers
 Kap G (class of 2012) - hip hop artist
 Robert Martin (class of 1991) - streetball player
 Sahr Ngaujah (class of 1995) - actor, Fela!, The Blacklist, Last Resort, Stomp the Yard
 Kawan Prather (class of 1992) - hip hop artist, record executive, record producer, songwriter
 LaTocha Scott (class of 1991) - musician, Xscape
 Tamika Scott (class of 1993) - musician, Xscape
 Saycon Sengbloh (class of 1996) - actor, singer, The Color Purple (musical), Wicked, Fela!, Motown the Musical
 Randy Thomas (class of 1995) - football player, NFL's New York Jets, Washington Redskins
 Kenan Thompson (class of 1996) - actor, comedian, All That, Kenan and Kel, and Saturday Night Live
 Shanell Woodgett  (class of 1998) - singer-songwriter
 Wanita Woodgett (class of 2000) - also known as D.Woods, former member of Danity Kane

Further reading

References

External links
 

1988 establishments in Georgia (U.S. state)
Educational institutions established in 1988
Fulton County School System high schools
East Point, Georgia